= IPhone Touch =

iPhone Touch is a mistaken reference to one of two touchscreen devices by Apple Inc.:

- the iPhone, which has cell phone features, or
- the iPod Touch, which does not.
